Deandre Latimore (born August 31, 1985) is an American former professional boxer who competed from 2006 to 2012, and challenged once for the IBF junior middleweight title in 2009.

Early years and amateur career
Deandre began boxing at the age of eight at the 12th and Park Recreation Center on the south side of St. Louis. Born and raised in one of St. Louis most toughest housing projects he over came a lot of adversity and keep and clear head and followed his dream.  As an amateur, Deandre was a 5-time St. Louis Golden Gloves Champion and he won several state, regional, and national championships. Because of his explosive style and track record for success, talent scouts and boxing enthusiasts from around the country began taking notice of Deandre’s ability as a boxer. He made such a strong impression as an amateur that a professional career was inevitable. Deandre was signed by local boxing promoter Steven Smith and later signed with Mayweather Promotions.

IBF World Title contention
In June 2008, Deandre faced and defeated the IBF #1 ranked contender Sechew Powell via 7th-round TKO, which set the stage for a showdown with hometown rival and former 2-division champion Cory Spinks. With only 20 professional fights under his belt, Deandre fought Spinks at the Scottrade Center Promoted By Rumble Time Promotions, Dibella Ent and Don King for the IBF light middleweight title and showed that he can compete with the world’s best, losing a close and somewhat disputed decision, as one of the judges scored the bout in favor of Latimore.
Prior to this fight Latimore Signed a second Co Promotion deal with Rumble Time Promotions adding Dibella Ent. He was managed by Jerry Gulliano.
After losing the fight to Spinks, he was briefly managed and trained by local trainer/manager Jose Ponce. Latimore worked with Ponce/Seat Pound for Pound for two fights, winning one and losing the IBF eliminator against Sechew Powell. After the loss due to financial and things "not clicking"   with Jose, Latimore terminated manager and training contract with Jose/Sweat Pound For Pound. Latimore was later managed by Chris Watkins and went back to Las Vegas, to train with Jeff Mayweather.

Family life
Deandre is married to Shadonna Latimore and  has five daughters, and currently resides in Henderson Nevada.

Professional record 

|- style="margin:0.5em auto; font-size:95%;"
|align="center" colspan=8|23 Wins (17 knockouts, 6 decisions), 4 Losses (2 knockouts, 2 decisions)
|- style="margin:0.5em auto; font-size:95%;"
|align=center style="border-style: none none solid solid; background: #e3e3e3"|Res.
|align=center style="border-style: none none solid solid; background: #e3e3e3"|Record
|align=center style="border-style: none none solid solid; background: #e3e3e3"|Opponent
|align=center style="border-style: none none solid solid; background: #e3e3e3"|Type
|align=center style="border-style: none none solid solid; background: #e3e3e3"|Rd., Time
|align=center style="border-style: none none solid solid; background: #e3e3e3"|Date
|align=center style="border-style: none none solid solid; background: #e3e3e3"|Location
|align=center style="border-style: none none solid solid; background: #e3e3e3"|Notes
|-align=center
|Loss || 23–4 || align=left| Carlos Quintana
| ||  ||  || align=left| || align=left| 
|-align=center
|Win || 23-3 || align=left| Milton Nunez
|||  ||  || align=left| ||
|-align=center
|Win || 22-3 || align=left| Dennis Sharpe
| ||  ||  || align=left| ||
|-align=center
|Win || 21-3 || align=left| Darien Ford
| ||  ||  || align=left| ||
|-align=center
|Loss || 20–3 || align=left| Sechew Powell
| ||  ||  || align=left| || align=left|
|-align=center
|Win || 20–2 || align=left| Sammy Sparkman
| ||  ||  || align=left| ||
|-align=center
|Loss || 19–2 || align=left| Cory Spinks
| ||  ||  || align=left| || align=left|
|-align=center
|Win || 19–1 || align=left| Sechew Powell
| ||  ||  || align=left| ||
|-align=center
|Win || 18–1 || align=left| Durrell Richardson
| ||  ||  || align=left| || align=left|
|-align=center
|Win || 17–1 || align=left| Ed Lee Humes
| ||  ||  || align=left| ||
|-align=center
|Win || 16–1 || align=left| Mikel Williams
| ||  ||  || align=left| ||
|-align=center
|Win || 15–1 || align=left| Rodney Tatum
| ||  ||  || align=left| ||
|-align=center
|Win || 14–1 || align=left| Sean Rawley Wilson
| ||  ||  || align=left| ||
|-align=center
|Win || 13–1 || align=left| Brian Paul
| ||  ||  || align=left| ||
|-align=center
|Win || 12–1 || align=left| Damone Wright
| ||  ||  || align=left| ||
|-align=center
|Loss || 11–1 || align=left| Ian Gardner
| ||  ||  || align=left| ||
|-align=center
|Win || 11–0 || align=left| Leo Laudat
| ||  ||  || align=left| ||
|-align=center
|Win || 10–0 || align=left| Rodney Freeman
| ||  ||  || align=left| ||
|-align=center
|Win || 9–0 || align=left| Jessie Davis
| ||  ||  || align=left| || align=left|
|-align=center
|Win || 8–0 || align=left| Charles Walker
| ||  ||  || align=left| ||
|-align=center
|Win || 7–0 || align=left| William Deets
| ||  ||  || align=left|||
|-align=center
|Win || 6–0 || align=left| Reuben Rodriquez
| ||  ||  || align=left| ||
|-align=center
|Win || 5–0 || align=left| Jonathan Bruce
| ||  ||  || align=left| ||
|-align=center
|Win || 4–0 || align=left| Wesley Martin
| ||  ||  || align=left| ||
|-align=center
|Win || 3–0 || align=left| David Bridges
| ||  ||  || align=left| ||
|-align=center
|Win || 2–0 || align=left| Hosea Smith
| ||  ||  || align=left| ||
|-align=center
|Win || 1–0 || align=left| Chris Mickle
| ||  ||  || align=left| || align=left|

External links

1985 births
Living people
Boxers from St. Louis
Light-middleweight boxers
American male boxers